The Nordic combined events have been contested at the Winter Olympic Games since 1924. The first competition involved 18 km cross-country skiing, followed by ski jumping.

History 
Whoever earned the most points from both competitions won the event. At the 1952 Winter Olympics, the ski jumping was held first, followed by 18 km cross-country skiing. The cross-country skiing portion was reduced to 15 km at the 1956 Winter Olympics. The ski jumping styles would change over the years as well, from the Kongsberger technique after World War I to the Daescher technique in the 1950s to the current V-style from 1985 onwards.

The cross-country skiing technique would switch from classical to freestyle for all competitions beginning in 1985. At the 1988 Winter Olympics the Gundersen method was adopted, meaning the 15 km cross country portion would go from an interval start race to a pursuit race, so that whoever crossed the finish line first won the event.

The team event with a 3 x 10 km cross country relay started at the 1988 Winter Olympics, changing to the current 4 x 5 km cross-country relay at the 1998 Winter Olympics. The 7.5 km sprint event was added at the 2002 Winter Olympics. Nordic combined remains a men's only event as of the 2010 Winter Olympics. For the 2010 Winter Games, the 15 km Individual Gundersen which consisted of 2 jumps from the normal hill followed by 15 km cross country will be replaced by a 10 km individual normal hill event which will consist of one jump from the individual normal hill following by 10 km of cross country using the Gundersen system while the 7.5 km sprint will be replaced by the 10 km individual large hill event.

Today the International Ski Federation sanction no women's competitions. However it was decided in early-November 2016 that women's competitions were to be established at the Olympic Winter Games in 2022.

Events

Medal table 

Sources (after the 2022 Winter Olympics):
Accurate as of 2022 Winter Olympics.

Number of Nordic combined skiers by nation

See also

 List of Olympic venues in Nordic combined

References

 International Olympic Committee information on the Nordic combined medalists. - accessed 17 February 2010.

External links

 
Sports at the Winter Olympics
Skiing at the Winter Olympics

Olympics